The Bull is a pub on Main Road, St Paul's Cray, London Borough of Bromley.

It is a Grade II listed building, dating back to the 18th century.

References

External links

Grade II listed pubs in London
Pubs in the London Borough of Bromley